The Bohemian-Moravian Hockey League was the top level of ice hockey in the Protectorate of Bohemia and Moravia in 1939–1944. It was known as the Mistrovství Čech a Moravy in 1939–1940 and the Národní liga in 1941–1944.

Champions 
1939-40 – ČLTK Praha
1940-41 – LTC Praha
1941-42 – LTC Praha
1942-43 – LTC Praha
1943-44 – LTC Praha

External links
History of Czech ice hockey

 
Ice hockey leagues in the Czech Republic
Defunct ice hockey leagues in Europe
Ice hockey leagues in Czechoslovakia